Kol Mevaser is a Yiddish broadcaster, which runs as a news hotline. It has options for news, weather forecasts and traffic reports, together with scholarly information on several issues which are important to the Yiddish-speaking Haredi Jewish community, and interviews with important figures.

Programming and content 
Kol Mevaser was established in 2005 by Zalmen Wieder who is still the main news presenter on the hotline. Kol Mevaser serves as a replacement for radio broadcasting for the Yiddish-speaking Orthodox Jewish community which relies heavily on news and information within the community that is delivered in Yiddish. It is one of the main sources of information for the Yiddish-speaking community globally with the largest audiences in the US, Canada, Israel and the U.K.

The news is broadcast throughout the day, with the main news programs – the local & world news and Jewish news – being updated twice a day. Beside the bulletin that's being updated constantly during daytime and during the night only in time of major political or other news developing .The political news and business news are updated daily by Yossi Gestetner who also gives analysis on current events. Other categories are updated less frequently, and interviews are conducted by Yitzchok Shloma Dresnser.

Listening options are news (Jewish, Hasidic, local, national, world, political, health, business) and current event interviews; weather; lottery winning numbers; long interviews, health, business and politics; Torah issues (including history and biographies of Tzadikim); traffic and a special music section with the latest in Religious Jewish music.

Contributors 
 Breaking/Main News: Zalmen Wieder
 Traffic Reports: David Goldstein
 Business/Political News: Yossi Gestetner
 Health: Hershel Meisels and Yoel Meirowitz
 Weird/Odd News: Ari Abramowitz
 Music interviewer and talk show host: Velvel Schmeltzer
 Interviews: Yitzchok Shloma Dresnser and Hendel Breuer
 U.S. Current Events Analysis: Yossi Gestetner,
 Political science and criticism: Yitchok Klar, Shimon Rolnitski, Yoel Felzen, Yosef Chaim Yoine Cohen Rapaport ("Yoine Cohen"), and Avrohom Yakov Terkeltaub ("Jake Turx"), senior White House correspondent for Ami Magazine.
 Global Affairs Analysis: Hershel Friedman and Mechel Fisher
Community Matters: Rabbi Shaul Klein, Rabbi Avrohom Yakov Vozner, Pinchas Glauber and Shaya Itzkowitz ("Eliezer Krausz")
 Psychology: Shimon Green, Naftali Stein and Mordechai Weinberger (LCSW)

Access Manu

1 News, weather, lottery,

1 News 
 1 Yiddish news,
 2 general news,
 3 bulletin,
 4 news interviews,
 5 political news,
 7 business news,

2
Weather

3
Lottery

3 interview ,analysis, and history,

1 general Interviews

2 health 
 1 rabbi hearshel missels
 2 yitzchock klahr
 3 mordchai weinberger (pda) q&a
 4 yoel mayorovits
 5 shimon green

4 business and economy 
 1 yossi gesstetner
 2 eli ekstein
 3 yakov engel (economic observations)  
 4 yitzchock ekstein
 5 Issamar Ginzberg
 6 Shimon green (business relations) 
 7 stock market updates 
 8 motty klein & pinchas glober 
 9 aron gotlib (real estate knowledge) 
 0 experience & success interviews

7 holocaust history

8 political analysis and criticism 
Weekly analyses by hershel friedman, turks, yoel mayorovitsh, shulem fried, avrum chaim friedman, yoel weber,

9 informative corner 
 1 shaul klein
 2 pinchas glauber
 3 yoel felzn 
 4 laizer kraus 
 5 velvy feldman
 6 shimon ralnitzki
 7 ari abramovits
 8 Mandy baum
 9 pinchas glauber Q&A

7 traffic conditions

8 torah corner

Yiddish24 
In July 2019, Kol Mevaser released a  website and a app called "Yiddish24" for iOS and Android users. The website and app offer the same content that is broadcast on the Kol Mevaser hotline.

See also 

Haredi news hotline

References

External links 
 
 "קול מבשר נייעס" (in Yiddish)
 "אקטועלע אנאליזן מיט הרב אליעזר קרויס-קול מבשר" (in Yiddish)

Political mass media in the United States
Broadcast journalism
Haredi Judaism in New York City
Mass media companies based in New York City
Mass media companies established in 2005
Mass media in New York (state)
Orthodox Judaism in New York City
Telecommunication services
Telephone newspapers
Yiddish-language mass media in the United States